Luisa Harumi Matsuo (born 8 August 1988) was a Brazilian group rhythmic gymnast. She also represented her nation at international competitions.

She participated at the 2008 Summer Olympics. 
She competed at world championships, including at the 2011 World Rhythmic Gymnastics Championships.

See also
List of Olympic rhythmic gymnasts for Brazil

References

External links
 
https://database.fig-gymnastics.com/public/gymnasts/biography/5007/true?backUrl=%2Fpublic%2Fresults%2Fdisplay%2F1862%3FidAgeCategory%3D8%26idCategory%3D79%23anchor_2380
 http://www.gettyimages.com/photos/luisa-estrada?excludenudity=true&sort=mostpopular&mediatype=photography&phrase=luisa%20estrada

1988 births
Living people
Brazilian rhythmic gymnasts
Brazilian people of Japanese descent
Place of birth missing (living people)
Gymnasts at the 2011 Pan American Games
Gymnasts at the 2008 Summer Olympics
Olympic gymnasts of Brazil
Pan American Games medalists in gymnastics
Pan American Games gold medalists for Brazil
South American Games gold medalists for Brazil
South American Games silver medalists for Brazil
South American Games medalists in gymnastics
Competitors at the 2006 South American Games
Competitors at the 2010 South American Games
Medalists at the 2011 Pan American Games
20th-century Brazilian people
21st-century Brazilian people